The  German city of Freiburg was bombed erroneously on 10 May 1940 by the Luftwaffe, killing 57 inhabitants.

Timing
The kette (three aircraft) involved, commanded by Leutnant Paul Seidel, were from 8. Staffel, Kampfgeschwader 51 "Edelweiss" (8./KG51) operating the Heinkel He 111 medium bomber. They had taken off at 14:27 from Landsberg-Lech Air Base, to bomb the French city of Dijon, or the alternative target Dole–Jura Airport, as part of the Battle of France. However, due to navigation errors they lost orientation and never arrived there. Although they were not able to determine their exact position, they were convinced of being on the other side of the Rhine and, in spite of the landmarks they saw, the town beneath them was thought to perhaps be Colmar, which is at a distance of only 22 miles. Since, on the other hand, the Freiburg Air Guard in Hilda Tower on the Loretto mountain identified the aircraft as German, it was only after the attack was already over that air raid warning was given. Starting from 15:59 the planes dropped a total of 69 bombs on the city.

Immediate consequences
The German command tried to cover up the mistake and passed the bombing off as enemy action. The German media accepted that version without any hesitation. UFA Weekly Review, for example, reported in its issue no. 506 on 15 May 1940 at the end of a longer contribution of the "brutal and ruthless air raid on an unfortified German city". The newspaper Freiburger Zeitung described it on 11 May 1940 as a "malicious air raid" by the enemy. In the course of this "sneaky, cowardly air raid against all laws of humanity and international law", the newspaper continued "24 civilians were overtaken by death". At the same time the incident was used to justify further attacks against the enemy. Thus, "any further planned bombing of the German population will be counteracted by five times as many German aircraft  attacking an English or French town." In a speech at the enterprise Borsig-Werke on 10 December 1940 Adolf Hitler accused the British Prime Minister Winston Churchill to have started with "terrorist" attacks against the civilian population with the bombing of Freiburg.

The pilots, for their part, declared to have attacked the secondary target Dole Tavaux. However, that declaration was made only later in the year. The claim that the duds of the attack were not German, had already been refuted by the time code. Nevertheless, the myth that foreign aircraft had bombed Freiburg had a long-standing basis. Background for this could have been memories of the air raids during World War I. Then Freiburg was bombed 25 times by allied aircraft. Another factor might have been the shelling of Freiburg by French artillery on 11 and 13 June 1940. On that occasion shells fell on the southern Loretto mountain,  Merzhausen, Günterstal, and the area around the airport as well as on the premises of the company Rhodia and the gasworks. This possibility of attack was eliminated by the advance of the German troops in France from 15 June 1940 onwards.

Later consequences

Colonel Josef Kammhuber, at that time commander of  KG51, alleged for a long time that it would never be possible to clarify who was responsible for the bombing of Freiburg on this day. In August 1980, however, he presented his knowledge regarding the bombing of Freiburg on 10 May 1940 to two military historians: "The fact that the attack on Freiburg was conducted mistakenly by a chain of III/KG51 is evident".
The German historians Anton Hoch, Wolfram Wette and Gerd R. Ueberschär contributed significantly to the clarification of the events on 10 May 1940. In consequence of their work the responsible persons could be identified in 1956. On 5 April 1956 The New York Times reported that the puzzle of who bombed Freiburg on 10 May 1940 had been solved.
On the Hilda playground in Freiburg's suburb Stühlinger next to which 20 children were killed, a memorial stone refers to the incident. The construction of the memorial stone was initiated by the Union of Persecutees of the Nazi Regime. On the 40th anniversary a preliminary plaque existing only for a short time was installed. It followed up the assumption that Freiburg was intentionally bombed by the German Air Force which was later disproved. The present monument was dedicated on the 45th anniversary. The present inscription on the plaque is based on the findings of historical research about the event. Mayor Rolf Böhme as well as the chairman of the VVN and the chairman of the SPD local association of the suburb Stühlinger spoke at the dedication of the memorial stone.

Further reading
 Anton Hoch: Vierteljahrshefte für Zeitgeschichte 4 (Quarterly Journal of Contemporary History 4), 1956, pp. 115 – 144.
 Anton Hoch: Aus Politik und Zeitgeschichte (From politics and contemporary history) No. XXI B/56 of 23 April 1956, pp. 321 – 332
 The document on 10 May 1940 in the Freiburg City Archive: C 4 / XI / 31/3, of the municipal headquarters Freiburg. Category: Military Affairs. Subject: Air raid on 10 May 1940, Issue 1 year 40/43.
 Gerd R. Ueberschär and Wolfram Wette: Bomben und Legenden. Die schrittweise Aufklärung des Luftangriffs auf Freiburg am 10. Mai 1940 (Bombs and legends. The gradual clarification of the raid on Freiburg on 10 May 1940). Rombach, Freiburg, 1981, 
 Gerd R. Ueberschär: Freiburg im Luftkrieg 1939–1945 (Freiburg during the air raids 1939-1945). Ploetz, Freiburg, 1990, 
 Len Deighton: Blitzkrieg - From the Rise of Hitler to the Fall of Dunkirk. William Collins, London, 2014,

See also
 Operation Tigerfish: Air raid on Freiburg on 27 November 1944.

References

Freiburg
History of Freiburg im Breisgau
1940 in Germany
1940 in military history
May 1940 events